The Dutch Women's Volleyball 2nd League or More precisely the Top Division is Netherlands second national Division in women's volleyball and it is organized by the Nevobo .

Between 2007/08 and 2011/12 it was called the B-League. Until the 2006/07 season it was played in two First Divisions. The league now has twelve teams and The champion with 2nd and third placed teams acquires the right to promote to the Dutch Women's Volleyball League.

For the 2020/21 season, Top Division was expanded to include a second pool of twelve teams. This was partly in connection with the unfinished season due to the corona pandemic in 2020.

List of Champions

2020/21 Team squads

References

External links
The Netherlands Volleyball Federation
  Dutch Topdivisie A.women.volleybox.net 
  Dutch Topdivisie B.women.volleybox.net 

the Netherlands
Volleyball in the Netherlands
Dutch Topdivisie